The year 1714 in music involved some significant events.

Events 
March 2 – Johann Sebastian Bach is appointed Konzertmeister at Weimar, having declined a post at Halle.
A school of dance opens at the Paris Opera.
Michel Richard Delalande assumes full control of the French royal chapel upon the retirement of his last co-sous maîtres.
Francesco Geminiani arrives in London, where he obtains the patronage of William Capell, 3rd Earl of Essex.
Melchior Hoffmann, composer, marries Margaretha Elisabeth Philipp; he is already suffering from a terminal illness.
Domenico Scarlatti becomes maestro di cappella at the Cappella Giulia in the Vatican.
Francesco Maria Veracini visits London and performs at the Queen's Theatre.
The first permanent church organ in the United States, the Brattle organ, imported by Thomas Brattle, is installed in Boston at King's Chapel.
John Tufts publishes the first instructional book for singing in the USA.
Gottfried Silbermann completes the new organ for Freiberg Cathedral.

Classical music 
Pirro Capacelli Conte Albergati – Cantate et oratorii spirituali, Op. 10
William Babell – Prelude in G major from the Frontispiece
Johann Sebastian Bach
Weinen, Klagen, Sorgen, Zagen, BWV 12 (movement 2 would later form the  movement of his Mass in B minor)
Widerstehe doch der Sünde, BWV 54
Herr Christ, der einge Gottessohn, BWV Anh. 55
Nun komm, der Heiden Heiland, BWV 61
Christen, ätzet diesen Tag, BWV 63
Tritt auf die Glaubensbahn, BWV 152
Erschallet, ihr Lieder, BWV 172
Himmelskönig, sei willkommen, BWV 182
Mein Herze schwimmt im Blut, BWV 199
Kleines harmonisches Labyrinth, BWV 591 (Now attributed to Johann David Heinichen)
Organ Concerto in E-flat major, BWV 597
The Little Organ Book
Nun komm' der Heiden Heiland, BWV 599
Gott, durch deine Güte, BWV 600
Lob sei dem allmächtigen Gott, BWV 602
Gelobet seist du, Jesu Christ, BWV 604
Vom Himmel kam der Engel Schaar, BWV 607
Wer nur den lieben Gott lässt walten, BWV 642
Alle Menschen müssen sterben, BWV 643
Toccata in C minor, BWV 911
Toccata in G major, BWV 916
Fantasia and Fugue in A minor, BWV 944
Aria variata in A minor, BWV 989
Violin Sonata in E minor, BWV 1023
 Antonio Caldara – Laboravi in gemitu meo
 André Campra – Enée et Didon
 Giovanni Maria Casini – Pensieri per Organo
Arcangelo Corelli
Christmas Concerto
Twelve concerti grossi, Op. 6, published posthumously
 François Couperin – Leçons de ténèbres
 Henri Desmarets – Grands Motets
 Christoph Graupner – Mir hat die Welt trüglich gericht, GWV 1103/14
 George Frideric Handel – Te Deum in D major, HWV 278
 Johann Ernst Prinz von Sachsen-Weimar – Violin Concerto in G major
 Reinhard Keiser – Musicalische Land-Lust
 Jean-Baptiste Loeillet – 12 Recorder Sonatas, Op. 2
 Johann Mattheson – Harmonisches Denckmahl (12 Harpsichord suites)
 Santiago de Murcia – Resumen de acompañar la parte con la guitarra
James Paisible – The Godolphin. Mr. Isaac's new dance, made for Her Majesty's Birth Day, 1714...
André Raison – Deuxième livre d'orgue
Jean-Féry Rebel – Les caractères de la danse
Alessandro Scarlatti – S. Filippo Neri (oratorio)
Jean-Baptiste Stuck – Héraclite et Démocrite
Franz Mathias Techelmann – Toccate, Canzoni, Ricercari et altre Galanterie
Georg Philipp Telemann – Nun komm der Heiden Heiland, TWV 1:1175
Giuseppe Valentini – 12 Allettamenti da Camera, Op. 8

Opera
Leonardo Leo – Pisistrato
Jean-Baptiste Matho – Arion (tragédie en musique)
Jean-Joseph Mouret 
Les Amours de Ragonde
Les Fêtes ou Le Triomphe de Thalie
 Nicola Porpora – Arianna e Teseo
Alessandro Scarlatti – L’amor generoso
Antonio Vivaldi – Orlando finto pazzo, RV 727

Births 
January 1 – Giovanni Battista Mancini, soprano castrato, voice teacher (died 1800)
February – Susannah Maria Cibber, singer and actress, daughter of Thomas Arne (died 1766)
February 2 – Gottfried August Homilius, composer, cantor and organist (died 1785)
February 28 – Gioacchino Conti, soprano castrato opera singer (died 1761)
March 8 – Carl Philipp Emanuel Bach (died 1788)
April 16 – Pedro António Avondano, Portuguese composer
May 6 – Anton Raaff, tenor (died 1797)
May 12 – Johan Daniel Berlin composer (died 1787)
July 2 – Christoph Willibald Gluck (died 1787)
September 10 – Niccolò Jommelli, composer (died 1774)
December 23 – Ranieri de' Calzabigi, librettist collaborating with Gluck (died 1795)
date unknown
Antonio Besozzi, Italian oboist and composer (died 1781)
Abade António da Costa, Portuguese composer (died 1780)
Johan Foltmar, composer (died 1794)
Christian Gottlob Hubert, builder of keyboard instruments (died 1793)
Edmund Pascha, organist and composer (died 1772)
probable – Carlo Ferdinando Landolfi, luthier (died 1771)

Deaths 
January 4 – Atto Melani, opera singer (born 1626)
April 17 – Philipp Heinrich Erlebach, composer (born 1657)
August 25 – Johann Georg Kühnhausen, composer (date of birth unknown)
September 3 – Pietro Antonio Fiocco, composer (born 1654)
November 13 – Guillaume-Gabriel Nivers, organist (born 1632)
date unknown – Benito Bello de Torices, Spanish composer, maestro at the Convent of Las Descalzas Reales (born c.1660)

References 

 
18th century in music
Music by year